Napo (formerly the National Association of Probation Officers) is the trade union and professional association that represents probation staff including probation officers and other operational and administrative staff and Children and Family Court Advisory and Support Service staff in England.

Napo was formed on 22 May 1912. It was a member of the Standing Conference of Organisations of Social Workers from 1962, but decided not to join the new British Association of Social Workers in 1970.  In 2001, it opted to change its title to "Napo–the trade union and professional association for family court and probation staff".
It holds an annual general meeting which is open to all members of the union.

It retains a campaigning remit on both criminal justice and family court matters and is recognised as an influential and respectable source of information by both the media and politicians of all parties.

General Secretary Ian Lawrence was re-elected in June 2018 for another five-year term. He is among the few senior British/Asian trade union leaders to emerge from the community for some time and currently serves on the TUC General Council as the member representing black workers from unions with less than 200,000 members.

Ian has made a substantial number of contributions in the media on the situation pertaining to the state of the probation service in England and Wales following the part privatisation of services in 2014. He has also contributed to a number of keynote seminars examining issues within the  wider UK criminal justice system and has also provided oral evidence to the Parliamentary Justice Select Committee inquiry into the impact of the Transforming Rehabilitation programme. On 13 June 2020 Napo celebrated a major victory following the announcement by the Lord Chancellor that probation services would return to public ownership and control in June 2021. This news followed a long and sometimes attritional campaign which commanded widespread support from many politicians and groups who had also predicted major problems following the ill-fated reforms that were implemented by the then Secretary of State for Justice Chris Grayling.

Napo is an independent trade union but has good relations with the Labour Party front bench and a number of cross-party MP's and Peers in terms of assisting the development of its future policies on the probation and prison service and family justice issues. It is also a founding member of the Justice Unions Parliamentary Group.

The Probation Journal, established in 1929, is published by SAGE Publications in association with Napo.

General Secretaries
1930: H. E. Norman
1943: E. M. Hughes (acting until 1946)
1948: Frank Dawtry
1967: David Haxby
c.1970: Donald Bell
c.1980: Bill Beaumont
1993: Judy McKnight
2008: Jonathan Ledger
2013 to present: Ian Lawrence

References

External links
Napo website

Trade unions in the United Kingdom

Trade unions established in 1912
Social work organisations in the United Kingdom
 
1912 establishments in England
Public sector trade unions
Probation
Trade unions based in London
Trade unions affiliated with the Trades Union Congress